La Gioconda is an opera in four acts by Amilcare Ponchielli set to an Italian libretto by Arrigo Boito (as Tobia Gorrio), based on Angelo, Tyrant of Padua, a 1835 play in prose by Victor Hugo (the same source Gaetano Rossi had used for his libretto for Mercadante's Il giuramento in 1837).

First performed in 1876, La Gioconda was a major success for Ponchielli, as well as the most successful new Italian opera between Verdi's Aida (1871) and Otello (1887). It is also a famous example of the Italian genre of Grande opera, the equivalent of French Grand-Opéra.

Ponchielli revised the work twice; the third and final version (that is used to this day) was first performed in 1880. There are several complete recordings of the opera, and it is regularly performed, especially in Italy. It is one of only a few operas that features a principal role for each of the six major voice types. The opera also includes the famous ballet Dance of the Hours, often performed separately or in parody.

Performance history
La Gioconda was first performed at the Teatro alla Scala, Milan, on 8 April 1876. It was especially successful in its third and final version first seen at the same theatre on 28 March 1880. The opera had its American premiere at the Metropolitan Opera on 20 December 1883.

Roles

Synopsis
The opera's title translates as The Happy Woman, but is usually given in English as The Ballad Singer. However, as this fails to convey the irony inherent in the original, the Italian is usually used. Each act of La Gioconda has a title.

Place: Venice
Time: 17th century

The story revolves around a woman, Gioconda, who so loves her mother that when Laura, her rival in love for the heart of Enzo, saves her mother's life, Gioconda puts aside her own romantic love to repay her. The villain Barnaba tries to seduce Gioconda, but she prefers death.

Act 1 The Lion's Mouth
The courtyard of the Doge's Palace

During Carnival celebrations before Lent, while everyone else is preoccupied with a regatta, Barnaba, a state spy, lustfully watches La Gioconda as she leads her blind mother, La Cieca, across the Square. When his amorous advances are firmly rejected, he exacts his revenge by denouncing the old lady as a witch whose evil powers influenced the outcome of the gondola race. It is only the intervention of a young sea captain that keeps the angry mob at bay.

Calm is restored at the approach of Alvise Badoero, a member of the Venetian Inquisition, and his wife, Laura. Laura places La Cieca under her personal protection, and in gratitude the old woman presents her with her most treasured possession, a rosary. The sharp-eyed Barnaba notices furtive behaviour between Laura and the sea captain indicating a secret relationship. Recalling that Laura was engaged to the now banished nobleman Enzo Grimaldo before her forced marriage to Alvise, Barnaba realises that the sea captain is Enzo in disguise.

Barnaba confronts Enzo, who admits his purpose in returning to Venice is to take Laura and begin a new life elsewhere. Barnaba knows that Gioconda is also infatuated with Enzo and he sees an opportunity to improve his chances with her by assisting Enzo with his plan of elopement.

When Enzo has gone, Barnaba dictates a letter to be sent to Alvise, revealing his wife's infidelity and the lovers' plan of escape. He is unaware that he has been overheard by Gioconda. The act ends with Barnaba dropping the letter into the Lion's Mouth, where all secret information for the Inquisition is posted, while Gioconda laments Enzo's perceived treachery, and the crowd returns to its festivities.

Act 2 The Rosary
The deck of Enzo's ship

Enzo waits for Barnaba to row Laura out from the city to his vessel. Their joyful reunion is overshadowed by Laura's fears as she does not trust Barnaba. Gradually Enzo is able to reassure her, and he leaves her on deck while he goes to prepare for their departure.

La Gioconda has been following Laura with the intention of exacting revenge from her rival. Alvise and his armed men are also in hot pursuit, but as Gioconda is about to stab Laura she sees her mother's rosary hanging round her neck and, realizing that it was Laura who saved her mother, has an instant change of heart. She hurries Laura into her boat so that she can evade her pursuers.

Enzo returns to the deck to find that Laura has fled leaving Gioconda triumphant. Furthermore, Alvise's men are rapidly approaching. Enzo sets fire to the ship rather than let it fall into the hands of his enemies before diving into the lagoon.

Act 3 The Ca' d'Oro (House of Gold)
Alvise's palace

Laura has been captured, and her vengeful husband insists she must die by poisoning herself (effectively committing suicide and condemning herself to Hell). Once again Gioconda has followed and has found her way into the palace, this time with the intention of saving her rival. Finding Laura alone Gioconda replaces the phial of poison with a powerful drug which creates the appearance of death.
The second scene begins with Alvise welcoming his fellow members of the nobility to the palace; Barnaba and Enzo are amongst those present. Lavish entertainment is provided and the act ends with the famous ballet Dance of the Hours. The mood of revelry is shattered as a funeral bell begins to toll and the body of Laura is revealed awaiting burial. A distraught Enzo flings off his disguise and is promptly seized by Alvise's men.

Act 4 The Orfano Canal
A crumbling ruin on the island of Giudecca

In exchange for Enzo's release from prison, La Gioconda has agreed to give herself to Barnaba. When Enzo is brought in, he is initially furious when Gioconda reveals that she has had Laura's body brought from its tomb. He is about to stab her when Laura's voice is heard and Gioconda's part in reuniting the lovers becomes clear. Enzo and Laura make their escape, leaving La Gioconda to face the horrors awaiting her with Barnaba. The gondoliers' voices are heard in the distance telling that there are corpses floating in the city. When Gioconda tries to leave, she is caught by Barnaba. She then pretends to welcome his arrival, but under cover of decking herself in her jewellery, seizes a dagger and stabs herself to death. In frustrated rage Barnaba tries to perpetrate one last act of evil, screaming at the lifeless body "Last night your mother offended me. I drowned her!"

Famous arias and excerpts

"Voce di donna o d'angelo" (La Cieca)
"O monumento" (Barnaba)
"Cielo e mar" (Enzo)
"Stella del Marinar" (Laura)
"E un anatema!... L'amo come il fulgor creato" (duet Gioconda with Laura)
"Si! Morir ella de!" (Alvise)
O madre mia nell'isola fatale (Gioconda)
Dance of the Hours
"Suicidio!" (Gioconda)
"Ora posso morir... Vo' farmi più gaia" (final duet Gioconda with Barnaba)

Parodies of the ballet music
The Dance of the Hours in Act 3 is considered one of the most popular ballets in history. The ballet was used in the 1940 Walt Disney animated film Fantasia. The segment consists of the whole ballet, but performed comically by animals. The dancers of the morning are represented by Madame Upanova and her ostriches. The dancers of the daytime are represented by Hyacinth Hippo and her hippopotamus servants. (For this section the piece is expanded by a modified and reorchestrated repetition of the "morning" music.) The dancers of the evening are represented by Elephanchine and her bubble blowing elephant troupe. The dancers of the night are represented by Ben Ali Gator and his troop of alligators. All of the dancers rejoice in the great hall for a grand finale, which is so extravagant that the entire palace collapses at the end.

Another famous parody of Dance of the Hours is Allan Sherman's song "Hello Muddah, Hello Fadduh", describing a miserable time at summer camp. It uses the main theme of the ballet as its melody. Sherman's song was later referenced in a 1985 television commercial.

Portions of the ballet were also used by Spike Jones and his City Slickers in their song parodying the Indianapolis 500.

Recordings

Audio
 1931: Giannina Arangi-Lombardi, Alessandro Granda, Gaetano Viviani, Ebe Stignani, Corrado Zambelli – Coro e Orchestra del Teatro alla Scala, Lorenzo Molajoli – (Columbia, Naxos)
 1952: Maria Callas, Gianni Poggi, Paolo Silveri, Fedora Barbieri, Giulio Neri – Coro e Orchestra della RAI Torino, Antonino Votto – (Cetra)
 1957: Zinka Milanov, Giuseppe Di Stefano, Leonard Warren, Rosalind Elias, Plinio Clabassi – Coro e Orchestra de l'Accademia di Santa Cecilia, Fernando Previtali – (RCA Victor, later Decca/London)
 1957: Anita Cerquetti, Mario Del Monaco, Ettore Bastianini, Giulietta Simionato, Cesare Siepi – Coro e Orchestra della Maggio Musicale Fiorentino, Gianandrea Gavazzeni – (Decca)
 1959: Maria Callas, Pier Miranda Ferraro, Piero Cappuccilli, Fiorenza Cossotto, Ivo Vinco – Coro e Orchestra del Teatro alla Scala, Antonino Votto – (EMI) 
 1964: Mary Curtis-Verna, Franco Corelli, Cesare Bardelli, Mignon Dunn, Bonaldo Giaiotti. – Chorus and Orchestra of Philadelphia Lyric Opera, Anthony Guadango – (Bel Canto Society)
 1967: Renata Tebaldi, Carlo Bergonzi, Robert Merrill, Marilyn Horne, Nicola Ghiuselev – Coro e Orchestra dell'Accademia di Santa Cecilia, Lamberto Gardelli – (Decca)
 1980: Montserrat Caballé, Luciano Pavarotti, Sherrill Milnes, Agnes Baltsa, Nicolai Ghiaurov – London Opera Chorus, National Philharmonic Orchestra, Bruno Bartoletti – (Decca)
 1986: Éva Marton, Giorgio Lamberti, Samuel Ramey, Livia Buday-Batky, Anne Gjevang, Sherrill Milnes – Hungaroton Opera Chorus, Hungarian State Orchestra Giuseppe Patanè – (Hungaroton)
 2001: Violeta Urmana, Plácido Domingo, Lado Ataneli, Luciana d'Intino, Roberto Scandiuzzi, Elisabetta Fiorillo – Müncher Rundfunkorchester & Chorus Marcello Viotti – (EMI)
 2005: Andrea Gruber, Marco Berti, Alberto Mastromarino, Carlo Colombara, Ildikó Komlósi, Elisabetta Fiorillo – Orchestra, Coro e Corpo di ballo dell'Arena di Verona, Donato Renzetti – Dynamic
Source:

Film or video
1979: Kirk Browning directed a television film with Renata Scotto (La Gioconda) – for which Scotto won an Emmy, Luciano Pavarotti (Enzo Grimaldo), Stefania Toczyska (Laura Adorno), Margarita Lilowa (La Cieca), Norman Mittelmann (Barnaba), and Ferruccio Furlanetto (Alvise Badoero).
1986: Hugo Käch directed a television film with Éva Marton (La Gioconda), Plácido Domingo (Enzo Grimaldo), Ludmila Semtschuk (Laura Adorno), Kurt Rydl (Alvise Badoero), Margarita Lilova (La Cieca) and Matteo Manuguerra (Barnaba).
1988: Television film made in Barcelona at the Liceu, with Grace Bumbry (La Gioconda), Fiorenza Cossotto (Laura Adorno), Viorica Cortez (La Cieca), Ermanno Mauro (Enzo Grimaldo), Ivo Vinco (Alvise Badoero), Matteo Manuguerra (Barnaba).
 2005: Live video recording made at the Arena di Verona: Donato Renzetti (conductor) – Pier Luigi Pizzi (stage director)Cast: Andrea Gruber, Marco Berti, Carlo Colombara, Alberto Mastromarino, Ildikó Komlósi, Elisabetta Fiorillo – Dynamic DVD Cat.33500
Source:

Adaptations in other media
La gioconda (US title: The Fighting Prince): Directed by Giacinto Solito with Alba Arnova (La Gioconda), Paolo Carlini (Enzo Grimaldi), Virginia Loy (Laura Adorno), Peter Trent (Alvise Badoero), Vittorio Vaser (Barnaba), Gino Scotti (Jacopo) and Giuseppe Campora, Attilio Dottesio, Ina La Yana and Vira Silenti (Italy, 1953, b/w).

See also

List of operas by Ponchielli

References
Notes

Sources
Full libretto of La Gioconda on impresario.ch, 2005 (In English) Retrieved 10 July 2011
Lascelles, George and Antony Peattie (Eds.), The New Kobbe's Opera Book London: Ebury Press, 1997. 
Holden, Amanda (Ed.), The New Penguin Opera Guide, New York: Penguin Putnam, 2001. 
Sadie, Stanley (Ed.), The New Grove Book of Operas, London: Macmillan Publishers Ltd, 1996.

External links
 , performance by Renata Tebaldi
 
 Profile of La Gioconda on OldAndSold.com, archived 7 June 2012

Operas by Amilcare Ponchielli
Italian-language operas
Grand operas
1876 operas
Operas
Opera world premieres at La Scala
Operas set in Venice
Operas based on plays
Operas based on works by Victor Hugo
Libretti by Arrigo Boito